This is a list of the performers at the Monterey Pop Festival, held June 16 to June 18, 1967 at the Monterey County Fairgrounds in Monterey, California.

There were five separate shows during the three-day festival (one on Friday night, two on Saturday and two on Sunday), with each performance approximately four hours in duration. Festival attendees could buy a full weekend ticket or tickets for the five separate shows. The showground arena, where the performances took place, had 5,850 seats, but many attendees had floor and perimeter standing tickets, allowing between 7,000 and 10,000 to witness the performances. Tickets were also sold that permitted entry to the fairgrounds without access to the performance arena. Total crowd estimates for the entire festival have ranged from 25,000 to 90,000 people in and around the festival grounds. All of the artists performed to a packed house, except Ravi Shankar, whose audience was at about 80% capacity following a rainy morning.

Friday, June 16 (evening)

The Association
Introduced by John Phillips.
 "Enter the Young"
 "The Machine"/"Along Comes Mary"
 "Poison Ivy"
 "Windy"
Note: Set list is incomplete.

The Paupers
Introduced by David Crosby.
 "Magic People"
 "Think I Care"
 "Tudor Impressions"
 "Simple Deed"
 "Let Me Be"
 "Dr. Feelgood/Bass Solo/Dr. Feelgood"

Lou Rawls
Introduced by Peter Tork.
 "Love Is a Hurtin' Thing"
 "Dead End Street"
 "Tobacco Road"
 "On a Clear Day You Can See Forever"
 "Autumn Leaves"
Note: Set list is incomplete.

Beverley
Introduced by Paul Simon.
 "Sweet Joy" (solo)
 "Sweet Honesty" (solo)
 "Picking Up the Sunshine" (with "house" band)

Johnny Rivers
 "Help Me, Rhonda"
 "Memphis, Tennessee"
 "Mountain of Love"
 "Midnight Special"
 "Do What You Gotta Do"
 "Tunesmith"
 "Baby I Need Your Loving"
 "Poor Side of Town"
 "Secret Agent Man"
 "Help!" (performed twice during set)

Eric Burdon and the Animals
Introduced by Chet Helms.
 "San Franciscan Nights"
 "Gin House Blues"
 "Hey Gyp"
 "Paint It, Black"

Simon and Garfunkel

Introduced by John Phillips.

 "Homeward Bound"
 "At the Zoo"
 "The 59th Street Bridge Song (Feelin' Groovy)"
 "For Emily, Whenever I May Find Her"
 "The Sound of Silence"
 "Benedictus"
 "Punky's Dilemma"

Saturday, June 17 (afternoon)

Canned Heat
Introduced by John Phillips.
 "Rollin' and Tumblin'"
 "Dust My Broom"
 "Bullfrog Blues"
Note: Set list is incomplete.

Big Brother and the Holding Company (with Janis Joplin)
Introduced by Chet Helms.
 "Down on Me"
 "Combination of the Two"
 "Harry"
 "Roadblock"
 "Ball and Chain"

Country Joe and the Fish
 "Not So Sweet Martha Lorraine"
 "I-Feel-Like-I'm-Fixin'-to-Die Rag"
 "The Bomb Song"
 "Section 43"

Al Kooper
Introduced by Paul Butterfield.
 "I Can't Keep from Cryin' Sometimes"
 "Wake Me, Shake Me"

The Butterfield Blues Band
 "Look Over Yonder Wall"
 "Mystery Train"
 "Born in Chicago"
 "Double Trouble"
 "Mary Ann"
 "Droppin' Out"
 "One More Heartache"
 "Driftin' Blues"
Note: Set list is incomplete.

Quicksilver Messenger Service
 "Dino's Song (All I Ever Wanted to Do)"
 "If You Live"
 "Acapulco Gold and Silver"
 "Too Long"
 "Who Do You Love?"

Lineup: Jim Murray, Gary Duncan, John Cipollina, David Freiberg, Greg Elmore.

Steve Miller Band
 "Living in the USA"
 "Mercury Blues"
 "Super Shuffle"

The Electric Flag
Introduced by David Crosby.
 "Groovin' Is Easy"
 "Over-Lovin' You"
 "Night Time Is the Right Time"
 "Wine"

Saturday, June 17 (evening)

Moby Grape
Introduced by Tom Smothers.
 "Indifference"
 "Mr. Blues"
 "Sitting by the Window"
 "Omaha"
 "Fall on You"
 "Hey Grandma"
 "Lazy Me"

Hugh Masekela
 "Here, There and Everywhere"
 "Society's Child"
 "Bajabula Bonke (Healing Song)"
Note: Set list is incomplete.

The Byrds
Introduced by Mike Bloomfield.
 "Renaissance Fair"
 "Have You Seen Her Face"
 "Hey Joe"
 "He Was a Friend of Mine"
 "Lady Friend"
 "Chimes of Freedom"
 "I Know My Rider"
 "So You Want to Be a Rock 'n' Roll Star" (featuring Hugh Masekela on trumpet)

Laura Nyro
 "Eli's Comin'"
 "Stoned Soul Picnic"
 "Wedding Bell Blues"
 "Poverty Train"

Jefferson Airplane
Introduced by Jerry Garcia.
 "Somebody to Love"
 "The Other Side of This Life"
 "White Rabbit"
 "High Flying Bird"
 "Today"
 "She Has Funny Cars"
 "Young Girl Sunday Blues"
 "The Ballad of You and Me and Pooneil"

Lineup: Paul Kantner (vocals, guitars), Marty Balin (vocals), Jack Casady (bass), Jorma Kaukonen (guitars, vocals), Spencer Dryden (percussion), Grace Slick (vocals)

Booker T. & the M.G.s
 "Booker Loo"
 "Hip Hug-Her"
 "Philly Dog"
 "Green Onions"
Note: Set list is incomplete.

Otis Redding
Introduced by Tommy Smothers.
 "Shake"
 "Respect"
 "I've Been Loving You Too Long"
 "Satisfaction"
 "Try a Little Tenderness"

Sunday, June 18 (afternoon)

Ravi Shankar
 "Rãga Todi-Rupak Tal" (7 beats)
 "Tabla Solo In Ektal" (12 beats)
 "Rãga Shuddha Sarang-Tintal" (16 beats)
 "Rãga Bhimpalasi"
 "Dhun In dadra" and fast teental (six and 16 beats)

Sunday, June 18 (evening)

The Blues Project
 "Flute Thing"
 "Wake Me, Shake Me"

Note: Set list is incomplete.

Big Brother and the Holding Company
Introduced by Tommy Smothers.
 "Combination of the Two"
 "Ball and Chain"

Note: This is Big Brother and the Holding Company's second set, hastily scheduled following the band's great reception on Saturday afternoon so that the performance could be included in the Monterey Pop concert film.

Group with No Name
Set list unknown.

Buffalo Springfield
Introduced by Peter Tork.
 "For What It's Worth"
 "Nowadays Clancy Can't Even Sing"
 "Rock and Roll Woman"
 "Bluebird"
 "A Child's Claim to Fame"
 "Pretty Girl Why"
Note: David Crosby stood in for Neil Young and Doug Hastings also made a guest appearance.

The Who
Introduced by Eric Burdon.
 "Substitute"
 "Summertime Blues"
 "Pictures of Lily"
 "A Quick One, While He's Away"
 "Happy Jack"
 "My Generation"
Note: The performance of "Happy Jack" is the only one of the six that was not filmed.

The Grateful Dead
 "Viola Lee Blues"
 "Cold Rain and Snow"
 "Alligator/Caution (Do Not Stop on Tracks)"

The Jimi Hendrix Experience
Introduced by Brian Jones.
 "Killing Floor"
 "Foxy Lady"
 "Like a Rolling Stone"
 "Rock Me Baby"
 "Hey Joe"
 "Can You See Me" (Possibly not filmed, as no footage has ever emerged)
 "The Wind Cries Mary"
 "Purple Haze" (Only partly filmed because cameramen were changing reels)
 "Wild Thing"

The Mamas & the Papas
Introduced by Paul Simon.
 "Straight Shooter"
 "Spanish Harlem"
 "Somebody Groovy"
 "Got a Feelin'"
 "California Dreamin'"
 "I Call Your Name"
 "Monday, Monday"

Scott McKenzie 
 "San Francisco (Be Sure to Wear Flowers in Your Hair)"
Note: McKenzie was backed by the Mamas & the Papas.

The Mamas & the Papas with Scott McKenzie
 "Dancing in the Street"
Note: McKenzie sat in front of the drums and played maracas.

References

Music festivals in California